Ecclinusa is a genus of plants in the family Sapotaceae described as a genus in 1839.

Ecclinusa is native to Panama and South America.

Species
 Ecclinusa atabapoensis (Aubrév.) T.D.Penn - Colombia, Venezuela (Amazonas)
 Ecclinusa bullata T.D.Penn. - Venezuela (Amazonas), Brazil (Amazonas)
 Ecclinusa dumetorum (Baehni) T.D.Penn. - Tafelberg
 Ecclinusa guianensis Eyma - northern South America, possibly Panama
 Ecclinusa lanceolata (Mart. & Eichler) Pierre - northern South America, Panama
 Ecclinusa lancifolia (Mart. & Eichler) Eyma - Brazil (Amazonas)
 Ecclinusa orinocoensis Aubrév. - Venezuela (Amazonas)
 Ecclinusa parviflora T.D.Penn. - Venezuela (Amazonas)
 Ecclinusa psilophylla Sandwith - Suriname, Guyana
 Ecclinusa ramiflora Mart - French Guiana, Suriname, Venezuela, Colombia, Ecuador, Peru, Bolivia, Brazil
 Ecclinusa ulei (K.Krause) Gilly ex Cronquist - Venezuela (Amazonas, Bolívar)

References

Chrysophylloideae
Sapotaceae genera